Reeds Creek is a stream in the U.S. state of California.

Reeds Creek was named after Captain Elbridge Gerry Reed, an early settler. Variant names were "Read's Creek" and "Reed Creek".

References

Rivers of California
Rivers of Tehama County, California